Mohammed Sannie (born 27 June 1986) is a Ghanaian football goalkeeper currently playing at Asante Kotoko.

Career 
Sannie began his career 2004 in the OneTouch Premier League with Hearts of Oak and replaces Sammy Adjei.

On 22 November 2008 leave Hearts of Oak and moved to Asante Kotoko.

International 
Sannie played his one and only game for the Black Stars in 2005 at CAF Confederations Cup.

Honours 
 2004: CAF Confederations Cup
 2007: Promising Player of the Year award.

References

1986 births
Living people
Ghanaian footballers
Asante Kotoko S.C. players
Accra Hearts of Oak S.C. players
Association football goalkeepers